White Strait is the small ice-filled strait between Black and White Islands, in the Ross Archipelago. First mapped by the Discovery expedition, 1901–04. Named by the New Zealand Geological Survey Antarctic Expedition (NZGSAE) (1958–59) for M. White, a member of the party.

Straits of Antarctica
Bodies of water of the Ross Dependency
Ross Archipelago